Shaban Ismaili (born 2 May 1989 in Gostivar) is a footballer from North Macedonia who is currently playing for German 6th tier side Calcio Leinfelden-Echterdingen.

References

External links
 German career stats - FuPa

1989 births
Living people
Association football defenders
People from Gostivar
Macedonian footballers
VfB Stuttgart II players
SG Sonnenhof Großaspach players
RB Leipzig players
RB Leipzig II players
SV Waldhof Mannheim players
3. Liga players
Regionalliga players
Oberliga (football) players
Macedonian expatriate footballers
Expatriate footballers in Germany
Macedonian expatriate sportspeople in Germany